Lamar Alexander Rocky Fork State Park (RFSP) is a  state park in Unicoi County in East Tennessee. It is situated in the Blue Ridge region of the Appalachian Mountains, close to the Tennessee-North Carolina state line.  The park is adjacent to the Cherokee National Forest, and it is in close proximity to the Appalachian Trail.  The Sampson Mountain Wilderness is also nearby.

Rocky Fork State Park was established in 2012, and facilities have not been developed.  Hiking and mountain biking are permitted on a network of old road beds, and fishing is allowed in Rocky Fork and South Indian Creeks, below and downstream of the State Park Main Entrance Gate.

The park was renamed from "Rocky Fork State Park" in January 2019 in honor of then-Senator Lamar Alexander, who was in his last term.

Nearby state parks
The following state parks are within  of Rocky Fork State Park:
Roan Mountain State Park
Mount Mitchell State Park, North Carolina

References

External links 
 
 Rocky Fork State Park - Tennessee Eastman Hiking and Canoeing Club's Trail Wiki

State parks of Tennessee
State parks of the Appalachians
Protected areas of Unicoi County, Tennessee
Protected areas established in 2012